Öxará ("axe river") is a lake-to-lake river in Iceland in Þingvellir National Park, a tributary of Lake Þingvallavatn. It descends to the rift forming Öxarárfoss, a waterfall.

See also
List of rivers of Iceland

Rivers of Iceland
Þingvellir